Rohita Rewri is an Indian politician and she was the member of the Haryana Legislative Assembly from the BJP representing the Panipat City in Haryana.

References 

Members of the Haryana Legislative Assembly
1980 births
Living people